The 2011 Twin Anchors Invitational was held from September 29 to October 3 at the Vernon Curling Club in Vernon, British Columbia as part of the 2011–12 World Curling Tour. The women's event, held in a round-robin format, began on September 29 and concluded on October 2, and the men's event, held in a triple-knockout format, began on September 30 and concluded on October 3. The purses for the men's and women's were CAD$27,000 (due to the lack of entries) and CAD $35,000, respectively.

Men

Teams

Results

A Event

B Event

C Event

Playoffs

Women

Teams

*Amy Nixon was substituted as skip in place of Shannon Kleibrink, and Bronwen Webster moved to third. Alternate Carolyn Darbyshire took Webster's place at second.

Round-robin standings

Playoffs

External links
Event Home Page

2011 in curling
Twin Anchors Invitational
Sport in Vernon, British Columbia